Find me, Lyonya! is a 1971 Soviet drama film directed by Nikolay Lebedev.

Plot 
The film tells about the relationship of a girl from an intelligent family and a working boy who become participants in the civil war. The girl offers Lena to live with her.

Cast 
 Anna Aleksakhina as Myshka
 Larisa Baranova as Dinka
 Viktor Chekmaryov
 Aleksandr Demyanenko
 Sergey Dvoretskiy as Kostya's pal
 Igor Efimov
 Vitya Elizarov as Proshka
 Andrei Gretsov as Minka
 Andrei Trofimov as Lyonka
 Ira Venchikova as Alina

References

External links 
 

1971 films
1970s Russian-language films
Soviet drama films
1971 drama films